Kanon is a visual novel developed by Key and published by VisualArt's in 1999. The story follows Yuichi Aizawa, who has returned to the town where seven years ago he would spend his school vacations, but has forgotten many of the details regarding his previous visits. Over the course of the series, Yuichi slowly regains these memories as he meets new friends and is reacquainted with others from his past. It was adapted by Toei Animation into a 13-episode anime television series broadcast in 2002 along with an accompanying original video animation episode released in 2003, both directed by Takamichi Itō with music direction by Hiroyuki Kōzu. Kyoto Animation also adapted it into a 24-episode anime television series broadcast between 2006 and 2007 directed by Tatsuya Ishihara with music direction by Shinji Orito. The discography of Kanon and its anime adaptations consists of one compilation album, three singles, three soundtracks, and three remix albums.

The core of the discography is the three original soundtrack albums. The visual novel's soundtrack, which was also used for the second anime series, was produced by Key Sounds Label and released in 2002. The music on the soundtrack was composed and arranged by Jun Maeda, Shinji Orito and OdiakeS. Two soundtracks were released for the first anime series in 2002 produced by Movic. The music on the anime soundtracks was composed and arranged by Hiroyuki Kōzu, Kōji Ueno, and Shinji Orito. Two remix albums were released for the visual novel in 1999 and 2003, and a remix album was released for the first anime series in 2003. A compilation album for the visual novel featuring previously released remixes was released in 2001. Three singles were released, one each for the visual novel and both anime series, covering the opening and endings themes of each media type.

Albums

Anemoscope
Anemoscope is an arrange album released by Key for the Kanon visual novel, and was packaged with the first edition of the Kanon visual novel on June 4, 1999. Ten of the twelve tracks on the album are arrange versions of background music featured in the visual novel, with the last two being the original versions of the game's two main theme songs "Last regrets" and "Kaze no Tadoritsuku Basho" sung by Ayana. The ten tracks were arranged by Shinji Orito, Magome Togoshi, and Kazuya Takase of I've Sound.

Recollections
Recollections is a best arrange album for the Kanon visual novel, and was first released on December 29, 2001 at Comiket 61 in Japan by Key Sounds Label bearing the catalog number KSLA-0003, and was widely distributed on November 29, 2002. The album contains one disc with thirteen tracks which primarily takes tracks from the first two albums released for the Kanon visual novel, Anemoscope and "Last regrets/Place of wind which arrives"; seven are from the former, and three are from the latter. The album also contains three new arrangements of songs featured in the Kanon visual novel: two background music tracks, and a remix of the game's opening theme "Last regrets" as an acoustic version sung by Lia. The tracks on the album were arranged by Shinji Orito, Magome Togoshi, and Ryō Okabe.

Kanon Original Soundtrack
The Kanon Original Soundtrack, from the visual novel Kanon, was first released on October 25, 2002 in Japan by Key Sounds Label bearing the catalog number KSLA-0006. The soundtrack contains one disc totaling twenty-four songs composed, arranged, and produced by Jun Maeda, Shinji Orito, OdiakeS, and Kazuya Takase of I've Sound. Ayana provides vocals for two songs, "Last regrets" and "Kaze no Tadoritsuku Basho". The first half of the last track is the short version of "Kaze no Tadoritsuku Basho", and after a lengthy pause a hidden track of an arrange version of "Yuki no Shōjo" plays which was originally featured in the album Anemoscope.

Re-feel
Re-feel is a piano arrange album with songs taken from the Kanon and Air visual novels and arranged into piano versions. It was first released on December 28, 2003 at Comiket 65 in Japan by Key Sounds Label bearing the catalog number KSLA-0010. The album contains one disc with ten tracks; the first five songs are from Kanon while the last five are from Air. With the exception of tracks two and four which are arranged by Riya of Eufonius, all the tracks are arranged by Ryō Mizutsuki, who is credited as Kiyo on the album.

TV Animation Edition Kanon Soundtrack Volume 1
TV Animation Edition Kanon Soundtrack Volume 1 is the first original soundtrack released for the first Kanon anime series and was released on May 5, 2002 in Japan by Movic bearing the catalog number MACM-1155. The soundtrack contains one disc totaling thirty-one songs composed, arranged, and produced by Shinji Orito, Jun Maeda, OdiakeS, Kōji Ueno, and Hiroyuki Kōzu. Miho Fujiwara provides vocals for two songs, "Florescence" and "Flower". Some of the tracks are new arrangements of music featured in the Kanon visual novel. The first edition release of the soundtrack came in a tall case, the same type for a DVD.

All songs arranged by Hiroyuki Kōzu.

TV Animation Edition Kanon Soundtrack Volume 2
TV Animation Version Kanon Soundtrack Volume 2 is the second original soundtrack released for the first Kanon anime series and was released on July 5, 2002 in Japan by Movic bearing the catalog number MACM-1156. The soundtrack contains two discs totaling fifty-five songs composed, arranged, and produced by Shinji Orito, Jun Maeda, OdiakeS, Kōji Ueno, and Hiroyuki Kōzu. Miho Fujiwara provides vocals for two songs, "Florescence" and "Flower". Some of the tracks are new arrangements of music featured in the Kanon visual novel.

All songs arranged by Hiroyuki Kōzu.

Orgel de Kiku Sakuhin Shū
 is an arrange album released for the first Kanon anime series which went on sale on July 25, 2003 in Japan by Movic bearing the catalog number MACM-1167. The album contains one disc with fifteen tracks of arranged versions of background music featured in the first Kanon anime which includes arrangements consisting of music boxes, pianos, harps, flutes, acoustic guitar, and other string instruments. All the tracks were composed by either Kōji Ueno, Hiroyuki Kōzu, or Masato Kamato, and arranged by Minami Nozaki.

Singles

Last regrets / Place of wind which arrives
"Last regrets /  is a single for the Kanon visual novel first released as a limited edition on November 23, 1999, but was also sold at Comiket 57 on December 24, 1999. The single contains seven tracks which includes original and instrumental versions of the game's two theme songs "Last regrets" and "Kaze no Tadoritsuku Basho", and three arrange versions of background music featured in the visual novel. The first half of the last track is the instrumental version of "Kaze no Tadoritsuku Basho", and after a lengthy pause a hidden track of a male vocal version of "Last regrets" plays sung by Kazuya Takase of I've Sound. Other produces of the single include Jun Maeda, Shinji Orito, and Magome Togoshi, with Ayana providing vocals for the original versions of the game's two theme songs.

Florescence / Flower
"Florescence / Flower" is single by the J-pop artist Miho Fujiwara first released in Japan on June 7, 2002 by Movic in Japan bearing the catalog number MACM-1157. The single was first released as a limited edition version containing two more tracks than the regular edition. The first is an instrumental version of "Flower" with background vocals by Miho Fujiwara, and the second is a background music track for Akiko Minase not featured in the first Kanon anime series by Toei Animation. The songs "Florescence" and "Flower" of the single were featured as the opening and ending theme songs of the first Kanon anime respectively.

All songs arranged by Hiroyuki Kōzu.

Last regrets / Kaze no Tadoritsuku Basho
"Last regrets / Kaze no Tadoritsuku Basho" is a single released in commemoration of the Kanon anime by Kyoto Animation. It was first released on December 28, 2006 in Japan by Key Sounds Label bearing the catalog number KSLA-0026. The single contains original, short, and arrange versions of Kanons two theme songs "Last regrets" and "Kaze no Tadoritsuku Basho" sung by Ayana. The tracks are composed, arranged, and produced by Jun Maeda, Shinji Orito, Kazuya Takase of I've Sound, and Manack.

Charts

References

Anime soundtracks
Soundtracks
Key Sounds Label
Video game soundtracks